Elisa Longo Borghini (born 10 December 1991) is an Italian professional road cyclist, who rides for UCI Women's WorldTeam .

During her career, Longo Borghini has won two bronze medals in the road race at the Summer Olympic Games, taking third-place finishes in Rio de Janeiro and Tokyo. She has also won two bronze medals in the equivalent event at the UCI Road World Championships, doing so in 2012 and 2020.

Career

She won the bronze medal at the 2012 UCI Road World Championships in the Women's road race event.

In August 2018 Longo Borghini confirmed that she would be joining the new  for 2019, after the Wiggle team had announced their demise.

In July 2021, she competed in the -long women's Olympic road race in Tokyo, and won the bronze medal.

In July 2022, she was named as one of the pre-race favourites for the first edition of the Tour de France Femmes. She ultimately finished the race in sixth place overall.

Personal life
She is the daughter of cross country skier Guidina Dal Sasso. Her older brother Paolo Longo Borghini also competed professionally as a cyclist, between 2004 and 2014. She is in a relationship with fellow cyclist Jacopo Mosca, who rides for the men's  team.

Major results
Source: 

2011
 5th Omloop Het Nieuwsblad
 UEC European Under-23 Road Championships
6th Road race
8th Time trial
 10th Omloop van het Hageland
2012
 2nd Time trial, National Road Championships
 3rd  Road race, UCI Road World Championships
 3rd  Time trial, UEC European Under-23 Road Championships
 3rd Omloop van het Hageland
 3rd Gooik–Geraardsbergen–Gooik
 3rd GP de Plouay
 5th Overall Thüringen Rundfahrt
1st  Young rider classification
1st  Mountains classification
1st Stage 5
 6th Overall Holland Ladies Tour
 7th Omloop Het Nieuwsblad
 7th Le Samyn
 9th Overall Giro d'Italia
1st  Young rider classification
2013
 1st Trofeo Alfredo Binda
 2nd Time trial, National Road Championships
 2nd Overall Tour of Zhoushan Island
 2nd Overall Emakumeen Euskal Bira
1st  Mountains classification
1st Stage 4
 2nd La Flèche Wallonne
 3rd Chrono des Nations
 4th Overall Giro del Trentino
 4th Le Samyn
 4th Tour of Flanders
 4th Durango-Durango Emakumeen Saria
 6th Ronde van Gelderland
 8th Road race, UCI Road World Championships
 9th Omloop van het Hageland
2014
 1st  Time trial, National Road Championships
 1st  Trophée d'Or
1st  Mountains classification
1st Stage 4
 1st  Overall Tour de Bretagne
1st  Mountains classification
1st Prologue & Stage 3
 2nd Grand Prix de Plumelec-Morbihan
 3rd Cholet Pays de Loire
 3rd La Flèche Wallonne
 3rd Gooik–Geraardsbergen–Gooik
 4th Tour of Flanders
 5th Overall Giro d'Italia
1st  Italian rider classification
 5th Durango-Durango Emakumeen Saria
 6th Overall Holland Ladies Tour
1st  Young rider classification
 6th Trofeo Alfredo Binda
 7th Ronde van Gelderland
 7th GP de Plouay
 7th Chrono Champenois-Trophée Européen
 8th Le Samyn
 10th Omloop van het Hageland
2015
 1st  Overall La Route de France
1st Stages 3 & 5
 1st Tour of Flanders
 1st Giro dell'Emilia
 2nd Road race, National Road Championships
 2nd Philadelphia Cycling Classic
 3rd Strade Bianche
 4th Road race, UCI Road World Championships
 4th Trofeo Alfredo Binda
 5th Overall Holland Ladies Tour
 5th Marianne Vos Classic
 5th Holland Hills Classic
 8th Overall Giro d'Italia
1st  Italian rider classification
 9th GP de Plouay
2016
 National Road Championships
1st  Time trial
2nd Road race
 1st Giro dell'Emilia
 1st  Mountains classification, Giro d'Italia
 2nd Durango-Durango Emakumeen Saria
 2nd Philadelphia Cycling Classic
 Olympic Games
3rd  Road race
5th Time trial
 UEC European Road Championships
3rd  Road race
7th Time trial
 3rd Overall The Women's Tour
 4th Overall Emakumeen Euskal Bira
 4th Strade Bianche
 5th Overall Festival Luxembourgeois du cyclisme féminin Elsy Jacobs
 5th Tour of Flanders
 5th La Flèche Wallonne
 9th Overall Belgium Tour
 9th GP de Plouay
2017
 National Road Championships
1st  Time trial
1st  Road race
 1st Strade Bianche
 2nd Overall Giro d'Italia
1st  Italian rider classification
 3rd La Course by Le Tour de France
 4th Ronde van Drenthe
 4th Gooik–Geraardsbergen–Gooik
 5th Omloop Het Nieuwsblad
 5th Amstel Gold Race
 9th Trofeo Alfredo Binda
 9th Liège–Bastogne–Liège
 10th Overall The Women's Tour
 10th Tour of Flanders
2018
 1st  Road race, Mediterranean Games
 3rd Strade Bianche
 4th Durango-Durango Emakumeen Saria
 5th Overall Emakumeen Euskal Bira
 6th Overall The Women's Tour
1st  Mountains classification
 6th Time trial, UEC European Road Championships
 7th Tour of Guangxi
 9th Time trial, UCI Road World Championships
 9th Overall Tour de Yorkshire
 10th Overall Giro Rosa
1st  Italian rider classification
 10th Overall Madrid Challenge by La Vuelta
 10th Trofeo Alfredo Binda
2019
 1st  Overall Emakumeen Euskal Bira
1st  Points classification
1st  Mountains classification
1st Stage 4
 1st Vårgårda West Sweden TTT
 2nd Giro dell'Emilia
 3rd  Mixed team relay, UEC European Road Championships
 3rd Time trial, National Road Championships
 5th Road race, UCI Road World Championships
 5th Overall Herald Sun Tour
 5th Cadel Evans Great Ocean Road Race
 6th La Course by Le Tour de France
 8th Overall Giro Rosa
1st  Italian rider classification
 8th Dwars door Vlaanderen
 9th Liège–Bastogne–Liège
 10th Overall The Women's Tour
2020
 National Road Championships
1st  Time trial
1st  Road race
 2nd  Road race, UEC European Road Championships
 2nd Overall UCI Women's World Tour
 2nd Overall Challenge by La Vuelta
 2nd Clasica Femenina Navarra
 3rd  Road race, UCI Road World Championships
 3rd Overall Giro Rosa
1st  Italian rider classification
1st Stages 1 (TTT) & 8
Held  after Stage 1
 3rd Durango-Durango Emakumeen Saria
 4th Emakumeen Nafarroako Klasikoa
 5th Strade Bianche
 5th La Flèche Wallonne
 6th La Course by Le Tour de France
 7th Three Days of Bruges–De Panne
 8th Tour of Flanders
 10th Gent–Wevelgem
2021
 1st  Mixed team relay, UEC European Road Championships
 National Road Championships
1st  Time trial
1st  Road race
 1st GP de Plouay
 1st Trofeo Alfredo Binda
 1st Stage 1 (TTT) Giro Rosa
 2nd Strade Bianche
 Olympic Games
3rd  Road race
10th Time trial
 3rd  Mixed team relay, UCI Road World Championships
 3rd Paris–Roubaix
 3rd La Flèche Wallonne
 3rd Liège–Bastogne–Liège
 3rd Emakumeen Nafarroako Klasikoa
 4th Tour of Flanders
 7th Overall Challenge by La Vuelta
 8th Amstel Gold Race
 10th Omloop Het Nieuwsblad
2022
 1st  Time trial, National Road Championships
 1st  Overall The Women's Tour
1st Stage 5
 1st Paris–Roubaix
 1st Tre Valli Varesine
 1st Giro dell'Emilia
 UCI Road World Championships
2nd  Mixed team relay
10th Road race
 2nd Overall Challenge by La Vuelta
1st Stage 1 (TTT)
 3rd Overall Tour de Romandie
 4th Overall Giro d'Italia
 5th Liège–Bastogne–Liège
 6th Overall Tour de France
 6th La Flèche Wallonne
 8th Strade Bianche
2023
 1st  Overall UAE Tour Women
1st Stage 3

Classics results timeline

References

External links
 
 

1991 births
Living people
Italian female cyclists
People from Verbania
Cyclists at the 2016 Summer Olympics
Cyclists at the 2020 Summer Olympics
Olympic cyclists of Italy
Medalists at the 2016 Summer Olympics
Olympic bronze medalists for Italy
Olympic medalists in cycling
Mediterranean Games gold medalists for Italy
Mediterranean Games medalists in cycling
Competitors at the 2018 Mediterranean Games
Cyclists of Fiamme Oro
Medalists at the 2020 Summer Olympics
Cyclists from Piedmont
Sportspeople from the Province of Verbano-Cusio-Ossola
21st-century Italian women